Arnoldo Mondadori Editore is the biggest publishing company in Italy.

History

The company was founded in 1907 in Ostiglia by 18-year-old Arnoldo Mondadori who began his publishing career with the publication of the magazine Luce!. In 1912 he founded La Sociale and published the first book AiaMadama together with his close friend Tommaso Monicelli and the following year, La Lampada, a series of children's books.

The publishing house kept working intensely even during the First World War, mainly on the publication of magazines for the troops on the front such as La Tradotta, which included contributions from famous illustrators and writers such as Soffici, De Chirico and Carrà.

In 1919 the publishing house headquarters were transferred to Milan. After the First World War, Mondadori launched several successful book series including Gialli Mondadori in 1929, the first example of an Italian book series dedicated to detective and crime novels, by international writers, a new genre for Italy. The series is distinguished by the yellow (giallo in Italian) color of the covers. The response from the public was positive, with five thousand copies sold in a month and eight thousand after a hundred days. In addition to those who are considered the masters of the genre, such as Raymond Chandler, Dashiell Hammett, Georges Simenon, Agatha Christie and Erle Stanley Gardner, in 1931 even some Italian writers began to take an interest in the genre and write yellow novels. As a result of the success and longevity of the series, still on newsstands, "giallo" has become the Italian name of the literary genre.

Despite a period of cultural autarky, in 1933 Mondadori started publishing works of international writers with the Medusa book series. In 1935, through an agreement with Walt Disney, the publishing house began the publication of a children's series based on Disney cartoon characters, which ran until 1988, when the agreement between Mondadori and the Walt Disney Company ended.

In 1950 Mondadori returned to the information magazines, abandoned ten years earlier with the suspension, due to the war, of the monthly Tempo. The weekly Epoca was started, which imported the American model of photojournalism into Italy.
A few years later, in 1962, Mondadori published Panorama. The magazine was founded as a monthly information magazine and it was only in 1967 that it became a weekly, inspired by the editorial formula of Time and Newsweek, and was transformed into a successful newsmagazine.

In 1952 Mondadori launched I romanzi di Urania (Urania's novels), a twice monthly Italian science fiction magazine that contributed to the wider diffusion of this genre in Italy.

In 1960 Mondadori launched Il Club degli Editori, the first Italian mail-order book club and in 1965 became the first Italian publishing house to launch low-cost paperbacks for sale through newsstands (Oscar Mondadori), an experiment that would be a huge success and that was imitated by many publishers. The aim of the series was to reach an audience not used to buying in bookshops. The first novel published was A Farewell to Arms by Ernest Hemingway, who immediately experienced great results in terms of copies sold.

Between 1950 and 1965, the number of employees at Mondadori rose from 335 to 3,000 and resulted in the company's decision to construct a new building in the outskirts of Milan, specifically within the municipality of Segrate.

In 1968, Giorgio Mondadori, Arnoldo's son and chairman of the publishing house, decided to assign the project for the new headquarters to Brazilian architect Oscar Niemeyer, after having admired his work on the Foreign Ministry (Palácio Itamaraty) in Brasilia three years earlier. Construction began in 1971 and the new headquarters was inaugurated in January 1975.

Through a joint venture with Gruppo Editoriale L’Espresso in 1976, Mondadori published La Repubblica, its first daily newspaper; Gruppo Editoriale L’Espresso was finally separated from Mondadori in 1991.

In 1981 Mondadori entered the television business with the launch of the Rete Quattro TV station, which was sold to Fininvest a few years later. In the same year, through a joint venture with Canada's Harlequin Enterprises, the romantic fiction book series Harmony began to be published in Italy.

The company has been controlled by Fininvest, Silvio Berlusconi's family holding company since 1991. Marina Berlusconi is the chairman.

In 1989, Mondadori expanded into Mexico by acquiring Editorial Grijalbo. Beginning in 2001, Mondadori operated a joint venture with Random House in Spanish-speaking countries. Random House bought out Mondadori's stake in 2012.

In 2006, Mondadori took a big step forward in its international expansion with the acquisition of Emap France, one of France's leading magazine publishers, today Mondadori France.

Mondadori was one of the first Italian publishers to enter the e-book market and in 2000 an agreement was signed with Microsoft Corporation for the creation of the first Italian site for the sale of electronic books. In 2010 Mondadori accelerated its presence: in June, the Group's online bookstore launched a store dedicated to digital books, with a vast catalogue of titles in Italian and English. In December, Mondadori reached an agreement for the international distribution of books produced by the Group's publishing houses on Google Books and Google eBooks. Thanks to an accord with Vodafone Italia, in 2011 Mondadori launched the first online newsstand for tablets. Through this new platform, it is possible to access the digital edition of the Group's major weeklies and monthlies. The digital development continued in July 2011 with an agreement between Mondadori and Amazon that makes the Group's e-books available through the Kindle store. In September 2011, Mondadori's digital titles were also made available on the iBookstore for the Apple iPad, iPhone and iPod touch.
The following year Mondadori Group and Kobo Inc., a leading company globally in digital reading, signed an accord for the distribution in Italy of Kobo's eReading platform and related devices. In 2014 Mondadori bought the trademark and assets of aNobii, the global social reading platform with more than a million users around the world, of which around 300,000 in Italy, with the aim of supporting the process of growth in digital for books.

In 2012 Mondadori published Fifty Shades of Grey, the first volume of the erotic trilogy by debut London author E L James, rapidly followed by the two other titles, Fifty Shades Darker and Fifty Shades Freed. The trilogy saw in Italy the same kind of unprecedented success it gained in the English-language world: with more than 3.3 million copies sold in Italy and 130,000 downloads of the electronic version, the three volumes reached first, third and fourth position of the bestseller list for 2012.

In 2015–16, the acquisitions of RCS Libri (was renamed to Rizzoli Libri) from RCS MediaGroup as well as Banzai Media mark the culmination of the strategy launched in 2013 of focusing on the traditional core businesses: books and magazines.

In 2016, the Italian Competition Authority ruled that Mondadori would have to divest the publishers Bompiani and Marsilio Editori, following its acquisition of RCS Libri. Marsilio Editori was sold by Rizzoli Libri to De Michelis family's GEM S.r.l. while Bompiani was sold to Giunti Editore for €16.5 million.

As part of the strategy of focusing on its core businesses, in 2018 the Group sold Panorama  and in 2019 its subsidiary Mondadori France to Reworld Media.

Mondadori war

Between 1989 and 1991, there was a financial conflict between Silvio Berlusconi and Carlo De Benedetti, two of the largest employers of those years.

In 1988 Berlusconi bought Leonardo Mondadori's (nephew of Arnoldo Mondadori) shares. Mondadori was then owned by three: Berlusconi's Fininvest, Carlo De Benedetti's CIR and the Formenton family (Arnoldo Mondadori's heir). Carlo De Benedetti convinced the Formentons to conclude an agreement that would allow him to obtain the Formenton's shares by 30 January 1991, but in November 1989 the Formenton family sided with Berlusconi, allowing him to become the new Mondadori chairman on 25 January 1990; De Benedetti then protested, citing its agreement. The three sides took the unanimous decision of an arbitrary award to solve the conflict.

On 20 June 1990 was the first verdict: the agreement between De Benedetti and Formenton was considered still valid; as a consequence, the Mondadori shares became owned by the CIR (De Benedetti) and Berlusconi left the chairmanship of the company. Berlusconi and the Formentons then appealed at the Appeal Court of Rome, which assigned the case to Civil Section I. This section was chaired by Arnaldo Valente and the Judge-Rapporteur was Vittorio Metta. The ruling was made public on 24 January 1991 and nullified the arbitrary award verdict and gave the Mondadori shares back to Berlusconi's Fininvest.

In 1995, after receiving some proclamations, the judiciary started investigating the authenticity of the ruling. It turned out that Berlusconi won thanks to the corruption of Judge Vittorio Metta. Metta was sentenced to 11 years in prison in 2003, but won an appeal in 2005. The Supreme Court of Cassation nullified that appeal in 2006, and Vittorio Metta was sentenced to 1 year and 9 months in 2007. Berlusconi has not been sentenced. The trial expired for time limit.

Business areas
Books
Magazines (Italy, France and worldwide licensing)
Retail: the company owns a chain of bookshops and the internet-based bookshop mondadoristore.it.

Imprints
The group today includes several distinct publishing houses, a number of which have more than one imprint:

Mondadori
Founded in 1907 by Arnoldo Mondadori in Ostiglia, but based in Milan since 1919, Edizioni Mondadori became one of the best-known Italian book publishers, with early collaborations with Disney and the Il Giallo Mondadori series of mystery/crime novels.

Giulio Einaudi editore
Founded in 1933 by Giulio Einaudi in Turin, it became one of the most significant Italian publishing houses of the twentieth century. Its authors included Cesare Pavese, Elio Vittorini, Italo Calvino, Leone Ginzburg and Bruno Zevi, and it was the publisher of Antonio Gramsci’s Prison Notebooks. It was acquired by Mondadori in 1994.

Edizioni EL
Based in Trieste and publishing children's books under the imprints EL, Einaudi Ragazzi and Emme Edizione. Giulio Einaudi editore has a 50% stake in the company.

Sperling & Kupfer
Acquired by Mondadori in the 1980s, this publishing house founded in 1899 is one of the oldest publishing houses in Milan. Its traditional international focus, and concentration on current affairs, has been supplemented in recent years by publications in fiction, non-fiction, economics, manuals and popular science. Its imprints include Frassinelli.

Edizioni Piemme

Acquired by Mondadori in 2003, Edizioni Piemme is particularly active in the area of religion and books for children and young adults.

Mondadori Electa
A group based in Milan with three imprints: Electa, active in the art and history of art sector since 1945; Mondadori, which publishes illustrated books in areas such as nature, hobbies and history as well as tourist guides; and Mondadori Arte, intended to present art, architecture, design and archeology to non-specialist audiences.

Mondadori Education
Formerly Edumond Le Monnier, was acquired in 2008 and based in Milan, Bologna and Florence.

Rizzoli Libri

Founded in 1927, Rizzoli is a large general publishing house which publishes works of fiction and non-fiction, books for young adults, graphic novels, manuals and illustrated books.

Rizzoli Education
Rizzoli Education is a leader in Italian school publishing, where it is present in every order of instruction through publishing products (paper and digital), services and technologies for students, families and teachers.

Magazines

Italy

 Automobile Club until 2011
 Auto oggi until 2011
 Bolero Film
 Panoramauto.it
 CasaFacile
 Casabella
 Casaviva until 2013
 Chi
 Ciak until 2014
 Confidenze until 2019
 Cosmopolitan until 2011
 Creare until 2007
 Cucina Moderna until 2019
 Cucina No Problem until 2018
 Donna Moderna
 Doppiovù until 1978
 Economy until 2012
 Epoca
 Evo until 2011
 Flair until 2016
 Focus
 Focus Brain Trainer until 2012
 Focus Junior
 Focus Pico
 Focus Storia
 Geo until 2015
 Giallo Zafferano
 Grazia until 2022
 Grazia Casa until 2015
 Guida Cucina until 2018
 Guida TV
 Icon
 Icon Design
 Il mio Papa
 Interni
 Jack until 2012
 Men's Health until 2013
 Nuovi Argomenti
 Panorama until 2018
 Panorama Travel until 2013
 PC Professionale until 2014
 Prometeo
 Sale & Pepe until 2019
 Spy
 Starbene until 2019
 Telepiù
 Tempo
 Topolino until 1988
 TuStyle until 2019
 TV Sorrisi e Canzoni
 VilleGiardini until 2013

Greece
Mondadori owns 41.66% of Greece's Attica Publications S.A., Athens DeeJay (Greece), and Rock FM (Greece).

Digital properties 

 AndroidWorld.it
 SmartWorld.it
 MobileWorld.it
 AlterVista.org
 PianetaDonna.it
 GialloZafferano.it
 Studenti.it
 Mypersonaltrainer.it
 SoldiOnline.it

Market shares and competitors 2019
 Italian market share (trade books): 26.2% (source: GFK, December 2019) – competitors: GeMS Group, Giunti Group, Feltrinelli Editore, Newton Compton, De Agostini Group.
 Italian market share (Educational): 21.7% (source: ESAIE, 2019) – competitors: Zanichelli, Pearson, De Agostini Group.
 Italian market share (circulation): 28.9% (in terms of value; source: Press-di, December 2019) – competitors: Cairo Editore, RCS MediaGroup, Casa Editrice Universo, Hearst Magazine, Condé Nast.

Financial performance 
Table with a comparison of Mondadori financial performance over the last 10 years.

The figures for 2018 are presented in accordance with IFRS 5, not including the figures for the asset sold (Mondadori France).

See also

 List of Italian companies

References

External links

 
Mass media companies of Italy
Publishing companies of Italy
Book publishing companies of Italy
Magazine publishing companies of Italy
Newspaper companies of Italy
Fininvest
Mass media in Milan
Companies based in Milan
Publishing companies established in 1907
Italian companies established in 1907
Italian brands
Bookshops of Italy
Visual arts publishing companies
Disney comics publishers